The 2019 WBSC Premier12 was an international baseball championship featuring the 12 highest-ranked national teams in the world, held by the World Baseball Softball Confederation (WBSC). It was the second WBSC Premier12 event. The championship was held from November 2 to 17, 2019, in Mexico, South Korea, Taiwan, and Japan.

The tournament served as a qualifier for baseball at the 2020 Summer Olympics. Two quota spots were allocated, with Team Mexico as the top finisher from the Americas earning one spot, and Team South Korea as the top-finishing team from the Asia/Oceania region (excluding Team Japan, which already qualified as host) earning the other.

Japan defeated South Korea in the championship game, and the bronze medal game was won by Mexico over Team USA.

Teams

The 12 highest-ranked national teams qualified to participate in the 2019 WBSC Premier 12, based on the then-most-recent WBSC World Rankings, which were as of December 17, 2018.

Format

Opening Round
The tournament began with three groups of four teams each playing in the 12-team Opening Round. Each team played three games, in a round robin format against the other three teams in its group.

Super Round
The top two teams from each group then advanced to the six-team Super Round, which was hosted at ZOZO Marine Stadium and the Tokyo Dome in Japan.

In the Super Round, the top two teams that advanced from each of the three groups competed in a round robin format against the top two teams that advanced from the other two groups, for a total of four games played per team.

Finals
Following the conclusion of the Super Round, four teams advanced to the Finals. The four teams were selected based on a combination of the results of the Opening Round game contested between the two teams in the same group that qualified for the Super Round (1 game), plus the teams' results in the Super Round (4 games).

The 3rd- and 4th-place teams competed in a Bronze Medal Game, while the 1st- and 2nd-place teams faced each other in the Championship Final at the Tokyo Dome.

Venues
Six stadiums were used during the tournament:

Opening round

Group A

|}

Group B

|}

Group C

|}

Super Round

|}

Finals

Bronze medal game 

|}

Championship final 

|}

Final standings

Awards
Following the conclusion of the tournament, the WBSC announced the Premier12 All-World Team. WBSC also announced the individual awards winners.

Prize money
The WBSC gave $5.2 million in prize money to participants, distributed as follows, with a minimum of half of a team's prize money to be distributed equally among its players:

Winner: US$1,500,000 (Japan)
2nd Place: US$750,000 (South Korea)
3rd Place: US$500,000 (Mexico)
4th Place: US$350,000 (United States)
5th Place: US$300,000 (Chinese Taipei)
6th Place: US$250,000 (Australia)
7–12th Place: US$180,000 each
Each win in Opening Round: US$10,000
Each win in Super Round: US$20,000
1st Place in Opening Round: US$20,000

Controversies 
The super-round game between South Korea and the United States played on November 11, which South Korea won 5–1, became a topic of debate due to an alleged misjudgment by an umpire, Tetsuya Shibata, against South Korea in the third inning. Baserunner Kim Ha-seong slid back to home plate before catcher Eric Kratz in the eyes of some was able to tag him out, but Tetsuya ruled it as an out instead. Team Korea's coach, Kim Kyung-moon immediately requested a VAR check, but was refused. Slowed-down television footage was available online, and some criticized the call claiming it was wrong and that South Korea lost a run due to the call. The Korea Baseball Organization held a meeting after the match with the tournament's technical directors and filed an appeal, additionally stating that Kratz physically obstructed Kim's path to home plate in violation of WBSC playing regulations. WBSC responded by saying that they respected Team Korea's perspective and would seek to make improvements in the future. The Japanese media initially kept this incident quiet on the news, and many ridiculed the controversy in Japan.

See also
 List of sporting events in Taiwan

References

External links
Premier12 WBSC 2019 homepage

2019 in baseball
International baseball competitions hosted by Japan
International baseball competitions hosted by South Korea
International baseball competitions hosted by Taiwan
International baseball competitions hosted by Mexico
2019
2019 in Japanese sport
2019 in South Korean sport
2019 in Taiwanese sport
2019 in Mexican sports
November 2019 sports events in Asia
November 2019 sports events in Japan
November 2019 sports events in South Korea
November 2019 sports events in Mexico
Baseball qualification for the 2020 Summer Olympics